Mayazomus is a genus of hubbardiid short-tailed whipscorpions, first described by Reddell & Cokendolpher in 1995.

Species 
, the World Schizomida Catalog accepts the following seven species:

 Mayazomus aluxe Monjaraz-Ruedas & Francke, 2015 – Mexico
 Mayazomus hoffmannae (Reddell & Cokendolpher, 1986) – Mexico
 Mayazomus infernalis (Rowland, 1975) – Mexico
 Mayazomus kaamuul Monjaraz-Ruedas & Francke, 2015 – Mexico
 Mayazomus loobil Monjaraz-Ruedas & Francke, 2015 – Mexico
 Mayazomus tzotzil Monjaraz-Ruedas & Francke, 2015 – Mexico
 Mayazomus yaax Monjaraz-Ruedas & Francke, 2015 – Mexico

References 

Schizomida genera